The Province of Reggio Emilia (Emilian: pruvînsa ed Rèz) is one of the nine provinces of the Italian Region of Emilia-Romagna. The capital city, which is the most densely populated comune in the province, is Reggio Emilia.

There are 42 comuni (singular: comune) in the province. Rolo, the smallest commune in the province by area, is the commune farthest to the East. Ventasso is the commune farthest to the West. The border towns of the Province are Ventasso, which is the smallest commune by population, to the south and Luzzara in the north. Luzzara is the second largest commune in Emilia-Romagna and has the highest number of foreign nationals in the region.

The province is home to the historical Canossa Castle, property of the countess Matilde; it is where the  Walk to Canossa of Henry IV occurred.  Representatives of the free municipalities of Reggio, Modena, Bologna and Ferrara met in Reggio Emilia's Sala del Tricolore in 1797 to proclaim the Repubblica Cispadana, adopting the three colour green-white-red flag to represent their newly formed Republic; it was later adopted in 1848 as the national flag.

Education

Four faculties of the University of Modena and Reggio Emilia are located in Reggio Emilia.  The Faculty of Engineering and Agriculture was established in Reggio Emilia in 1998, followed by the Faculties of Communication Sciences and of Education Sciences.  It is home to the Orto Botanico dell'Università di Modena e Reggio Emilia.

The Reggio Emilia approach to preschool education was started by the schools of Reggio Emilia after World War II and it's well-known all over the world, being one of the most advanced systems at present times.  It is based and inspired on theories of Malaguzzi, Bruner, Vygotsky, Dewey, Piaget and Gardner. Reggio Emilia holds the International Centre Loris Malaguzzi, a modern structure where the Reggio Emilia approach is implemented, exported and spread around the world.

Sports
With sports arenas including the Stadio Giglio and Palabigi, Reggio Emilia is home to the basketball team Pallacanestro Reggiana.  The Camparini Gioielli Cup is a yearly challenger-level tennis tournament played on clay in Reggio Emilia.  A.C. Reggiana 1919 is the historical soccer team of Reggio Emilia; it currently plays in the third national soccer league Prima Divisione. Stadio Giglio (actual attendance is 29.650) is the home play ground for A.C. Reggiana 1919.

See also
 A.C. Reggiana 1919
 Art collection of Fondazione Manodori
 Comuni of the Province of Reggio Emilia
 Palabigi
 Pallacanestro Reggiana
 Reggio Emilia approach
 Reggio Emilia chess tournament
 Stadio Giglio
 University of Modena and Reggio Emilia

References

External links

 

 
Reggio Emilia